Greg Anderson (born April 5, 1961) is a Canadian actor who studied at the Lee Strasberg school for Actors in London, England and lives in Woodstock, New Brunswick. He was born in Newcastle (now Miramichi), and was raised in Chatham Head, New Brunswick. He grew up and attended school in Duncan, British Columbia.  Although an established stage actor, he is best known for his roles on television shows such as Stargate SG-1 (6 episodes), Stargate: The Ark of Truth, The 4400 (2 episodes), Tru Calling, and The X-Files.

In 2006, he played Günter Guillaume in the Canadian premiere of Michael Frayn's play Democracy.

References

External links

1961 births
Canadian male television actors
Canadian male film actors
Canadian male voice actors
Lee Strasberg Theatre and Film Institute alumni
Living people
Male actors from New Brunswick
People from Miramichi, New Brunswick